Ricinus communis, the castor bean or castor oil plant, is a species of perennial flowering plant in the spurge family, Euphorbiaceae. It is the sole species in the monotypic genus, Ricinus, and subtribe, Ricininae. The evolution of castor and its relation to other species are currently being studied using modern genetic tools. It reproduces with a mixed pollination system which favors selfing by geitonogamy but at the same time can be an out-crosser by anemophily (wind pollination) or entomophily (insect pollination).

Its seed is the castor bean, which, despite its name, is not a bean (that is, the seed of many Fabaceae). Castor is indigenous to the southeastern Mediterranean Basin, Eastern Africa, and India, but is widespread throughout tropical regions (and widely grown elsewhere as an ornamental plant).

Castor seed is the source of castor oil, which has a wide variety of uses. The seeds contain between 40% and 60% oil that is rich in triglycerides, mainly ricinolein. The seed also contains ricin, a highly potent water-soluble toxin, which is also present in lower concentrations throughout the plant.

The plant known as "false castor oil plant", Fatsia japonica, is not closely related.

Description
Ricinus communis can vary greatly in its growth habit and appearance. The variability has been increased by breeders who have selected a range of cultivars for leaf and flower colours, and for oil production.

In some varieties they start off dark reddish purple or bronze when young, gradually changing to a dark green, sometimes with a reddish tinge, as they mature. The leaves of some other varieties are green practically from the start, whereas in yet others a pigment masks the green color of all the chlorophyll-bearing parts, leaves, stems and young fruit, so that they remain a dramatic purple-to-reddish-brown throughout the life of the plant. Plants with the dark leaves can be found growing next to those with green leaves, so there is most likely only a single gene controlling the production of the pigment in some varieties. The stems and the spherical, spiny seed capsules also vary in pigmentation. The fruit capsules of some varieties are more showy than the flowers.

The flowers lack petals and are unisexual (male and female) where both types are borne on the same plant (monoecious) in terminal panicle-like inflorescences of green or, in some varieties, shades of red. The male flowers are numerous, yellowish-green with prominent creamy stamens; the female flowers, borne at the tips of the spikes, lie within the immature spiny capsules, are relatively few in number and have prominent red stigmas.

The fruit is a spiny, greenish (to reddish-purple) capsule containing large, oval, shiny, bean-like, highly poisonous seeds with variable brownish mottling. Castor seeds have a warty appendage called the caruncle, which is a type of elaiosome. The caruncle promotes the dispersal of the seed by ants (myrmecochory).

Chemistry 
Three terpenoids and a tocopherol-related compound have been found in the aerial parts of Ricinus. Compounds named (3E,7Z,11E)-19-hydroxycasba-3,7,11-trien-5-one, 6α-hydroxy-10β-methoxy-7α,8α-epoxy-5-oxocasbane-20,10-olide, 15α-hydroxylup-20(29)-en-3-one, and (2R,4aR,8aR)-3,4,4a,8a-tetrahydro-4a-hydroxy-2,6,7,8a-tetramethyl-2-(4,8, 12-trimethyltridecyl)-2H-chromene-5,8-dione were isolated from the methanol extracts of Ricinus communis by chromatographic methods.
Partitioned h-hexane fraction of Ricinus root methanol extract resulted in enrichment of two triterpenes: lupeol and urs-6-ene-3,16-dione (erandone). Crude methanolic extract, enriched n-hexane fraction and isolates at doses 100 mg/kg p.o. exhibited significant (P < 0.001) anti-inflammatory activity in carrageenan-induced hind paw oedema model.

Taxonomy 
Carl Linnaeus used the name Ricinus because it is a Latin word for tick; the seed is so named because it has markings and a bump at the end that resemble certain ticks. The genus Ricinus also exists in zoology, and designates insects (not ticks) which are parasites of birds; this is possible because the names of animals and plants are governed by different nomenclature codes.

The common name "castor oil" probably comes from its use as a replacement for castoreum, a perfume base made from the dried perineal glands of the beaver (castor in Latin). It has another common name, palm of Christ, or Palma Christi, that derives from castor oil's reputed ability to heal wounds and cure ailments.

Ecology 

Ricinus communis is the host plant of the common castor butterfly (Ariadne merione), the eri silkmoth (Samia cynthia ricini), and the castor semi-looper moth (Achaea janata). It is also used as a food plant by the larvae of some other species of Lepidoptera, including Hypercompe hambletoni and the nutmeg (Discestra trifolii). A jumping spider Evarcha culicivora has an association with R. communis. They consume the nectar for food and preferentially use these plants as a location for courtship.

Cultivation 

Although Ricinus communis is indigenous to the southeastern Mediterranean Basin, Eastern Africa, and India, today it is widespread throughout tropical regions. In areas with a suitable climate, castor establishes itself easily where it can become an invasive plant and can often be found on wasteland.

It is also used extensively as a decorative plant in parks and other public areas, particularly as a "dot plant" in traditional bedding schemes. In areas prone to frost it is usually shorter, and grown as if it were an annual. However, it can grow well outdoors in cooler climates, at least in southern England, and the leaves do not appear to suffer frost damage in sheltered spots, where it remains evergreen. It was used in Edwardian times in the parks of Toronto, Canada. Although not cultivated there, the plant grows wild in the US, notably Griffith Park in Los Angeles.

Cultivars

Selections have been made by breeders for use as ornamental plants (heights refer to plants grown as annuals) and for commercial production of castor oil.

Ornamental cultivars
'Carmencita' has gained the Royal Horticultural Society's Award of Garden Merit 
 'Carmencita Bright Red' has red stems, dark purplish leaves and red seed pods;
 'Carmencita Pink' has green leaves and pink seed pods
 'Gibsonii' has red-tinged leaves with reddish veins and bright scarlet seed pods
 'New Zealand Purple' has plum colored leaves tinged with red, plum colored seed pods turn to red as they ripen
 'Red Spire' is tall with red stems and bronze foliage
 'Zanzibarensis' is also tall, with large, mid-green leaves ( long) that have white midribs

Cultivars for oil production:
 'Hale' was launched in the 1970s for the US state of Texas. It is short (up to ) and has several racemes
 'Brigham' is a variety with reduced ricin content adapted for Texas, US.
 'BRS Nordestina' was developed by Brazil's Embrapa in 1990 for hand harvest and semi-arid environments
 'BRS Energia" was developed by Embrapa in 2004 for mechanised or hand harvest
 'GCH6' was developed by Sardarkrushinagar Dantiwada University, India, 2004: it is resistant to root rot and tolerant to fusarium wilt
 'GCH5' was developed by Sardarkrushinagar Dantiwada University, 1995. It is resistant to fusarium wilt
 'Abaro' was developed by the Ethiopian Institute of Agricultural Research's Essential Oils Research Center for hand harvest
 'Hiruy' was developed by the Ethiopian Institute of Agricultural Research's Melkassa and Wondo Genet Agricultural Research Centers for hand harvest during 2010/2011

Allergenicity and toxicity 
Ricinus is extremely allergenic, and has an OPALS allergy scale rating of 10 out of 10. The plant is also a very strong trigger for asthma, and allergies to Ricinus are commonplace and severe.

The castor oil plant produces abundant amounts of very light pollen, which easily become airborne and can be inhaled into the lungs, triggering allergic reactions. The sap of the plant causes skin rashes. Individuals who are allergic to the plant can also develop rashes from merely touching the leaves, flowers, or seeds. These individuals can also have cross-allergic reactions to latex sap from the related Hevea brasiliensis plant.

The toxicity of raw castor beans is due to the presence of ricin. Although the lethal dose in adults is considered to be four to eight seeds, reports of actual poisoning are relatively rare. According to the Guinness World Records, this is the world's most poisonous common plant. Symptoms of overdosing on ricin, which can include nausea, diarrhea, tachycardia, hypotension and seizures, persist for up to a week. The poison can be extracted from castor by concentrating it with a fairly complicated process similar to that used for extracting cyanide from almonds.

If ricin is ingested, symptoms commonly begin within two to four hours, but may be delayed by up to 36 hours. These include a burning sensation in mouth and throat, abdominal pain, purging and bloody diarrhea. Within several days there is severe dehydration, a drop in blood pressure and a decrease in urine. Unless treated, death can be expected to occur within 3–5 days; however, in most cases a full recovery can be made.

Poisoning occurs when animals, including humans, ingest broken castor beans or break the seed by chewing: intact seeds may pass through the digestive tract without releasing the toxin. The toxin provides the castor oil plant with some degree of natural protection from insect pests such as aphids. Ricin has been investigated for its potential use as an insecticide. The castor oil plant is also the source for undecylenic acid, a natural fungicide.

Commercially available cold-pressed castor oil is not toxic to humans in normal doses, whether internal or external.

Uses 
Castor oil has many uses in medicine and other applications. An alcoholic extract of the leaf was shown, in laboratory rats, to protect the liver from damage from certain poisons. Methanolic extracts of the leaves of Ricinus communis were used in antimicrobial testing against eight pathogenic bacteria in rats and showed antimicrobial properties.

The pericarp of Ricinus showed central nervous system effects in mice at low doses.  At high doses mice quickly died. A water extract of the root bark showed analgesic activity in rats. Antihistamine and anti-inflammatory properties were found in ethanolic extract of Ricinus communis root bark. Castor oil and the plant's roots and leaves are used in the ancient Indian medicinal system of Ayurveda for various diseases, and it has been investigated in a few limited studies for its potential as an anti-nociceptive and anti-inflammatory herbal medicine.

Modern commercial usage 

Global castor seed production is around two million tons per year. Leading producing areas are India (with over three-quarters of the global yield), China and Mozambique, and it is widely grown as a crop in Ethiopia. There are several active breeding programmes.

Other modern uses include:
 Whether natural, blended, or chemically altered, castor oil still has many uses. For example, it remains of commercial importance as a non-freezing, antimicrobial, pressure-resistant lubricant for special purposes, either of latex or metals, or as a lubricating component of fuels.
 Castor products are sources of various chemical feedstocks.
 In Brazil, castor oil (locally known as mamona oil) is a raw material for some varieties of biodiesel.
 In rural areas, the abundant seeds are used by children for slingshot balls, as they have the right weight, size, and hardness.
 Because castor seeds are attractively patterned, they are popular in low-cost personal adornments, such as non-durable necklaces and bracelets.
 Castor oil has long been used on the skin to prevent dryness. Either purified or processed, it still is a component of many cosmetics.
 The high percentage of ricinoleic acid residues in castor oil and its derivatives, inhibits many microbes, whether viral, bacterial or fungal. They accordingly are useful components of many ointments and similar preparations.
 Castor oil is the major raw material for polyglycerol polyricinoleate, a modifier that improves the flow characteristics of cocoa butter in the manufacture of chocolate bars, and thereby reduces the costs .
 Castor oil is used in the US to repel moles and voles for lawn care.

Historical usage

Ancient uses 
Castor seeds have been found in Egyptian tombs dating back to 4000 BC; the slow-burning oil was mostly used to fuel lamps. Herodotus and other Greek travellers noted the use of castor seed oil for lighting, body ointments, and improving hair growth and texture. Cleopatra is reputed to have used it to brighten the whites of her eyes. The Ebers Papyrus is an ancient Egyptian medical treatise believed to date from 1552 BC. Translated in 1872, it describes castor oil as a laxative.

The use of castor bean oil (eranda) in India has been documented since 2000 BC in lamps and in local medicine as a laxative, purgative, and cathartic in Unani, Ayurvedic, siddha and other ethnomedical systems. Traditional Ayurvedic and siddha medicine considers castor oil the king of medicinals for curing arthritic diseases. It is regularly given to children to treat infections with parasitic worms. Modern medical research suggests the purgative action induced by castor oil helps clear intestines of parasites.

The ancient Romans had a variety of medicinal/cosmetic uses for both the seeds and the leaves of Ricinus communis. The naturalist Pliny the Elder cited the poisonous qualities of the seeds, but mentioned that they could be used to form wicks for oil lamps (possibly if crushed together), and the oil for use as a laxative and lamp oil. He also recommends the use of the leaves as follows:

In Haiti it is called maskreti, where the plant is turned into a red oil that is then given to newborns as a purgative to cleanse the insides of their first stools.

Castor seed and its oil have also been used in China for centuries, mainly prescribed in local medicine for internal use or use in dressings.

Uses in punishment 

Castor oil was used as an instrument of coercion by the paramilitary Blackshirts under the regime of Italian dictator Benito Mussolini and by the Spanish Civil Guard in Francoist Spain. Dissidents and regime opponents were forced to ingest the oil in large amounts, triggering severe diarrhea and dehydration, which could ultimately cause death. This punishment method was originally thought of by Gabriele D'Annunzio, the Italian poet and Fascist supporter, during the First World War.

Other uses 
Extract of  Ricinus communis exhibited acaricidal and insecticidal activities against the adult of Haemaphysalis bispinosa (Acarina: Ixodidae) and hematophagous fly Hippobosca maculata (Diptera: Hippoboscidae).

Members of the Bodo tribe of Bodoland in Assam, India, use the leaves of the plant to feed the larvae of muga and endi silkworms.

Castor oil is an effective motor lubricant and has been used in internal combustion engines, including those of World War I airplanes, some racing cars and some model airplanes. It has historically been popular for lubricating two-stroke engines due to high resistance to heat compared to petroleum-based oils. It does not mix well with petroleum products, particularly at low temperatures, but mixes better with the methanol-based fuels used in glow model engines. In total-loss-lubrication applications, it tends to leave carbon deposits and varnish within the engine. It has been largely replaced by synthetic oils that are more stable and less toxic.

Jewellery can be made of castor beans, particularly necklaces and bracelets.

Ricinus communis  leaves are used in botanical printing (also known as ecoprinting) in Asia. When bundled with cotton or silk fabric and steamed, the leaves can produce a green-colored imprint.

See also
 Kikayon
 Toxalbumin

References

Further reading

External links
 
 A Bean Called Castor Can Cut Carbon & Fuel the Future
 Ricinus communis L. – at Purdue University
 Castor beans – at Purdue University
 Ricinus communis (castor bean) at Cornell University
 Ricinus communis in Wildflowers of Israel
 Castor oil plant Flowers in Israel

Crops originating from Africa
 
Acalypheae
Monotypic Euphorbiaceae genera
Taxa named by Carl Linnaeus
Poisonous plants